The Occupied Enemy Territory Administration (OETA) was a joint British, French and Arab military administration over Levantine provinces of the former Ottoman Empire between 1917 and 1920, set up on 23 October 1917 following the Sinai and Palestine Campaign and Arab Revolt of World War I. Although it was declared by the British military, who were in control of the region, it was followed on 30 September 1918 by the 1918 Anglo-French Modus Vivendi in which it was agreed that the British would give the French control in certain areas, and the Hashemites were given joint control of the Eastern area per T.E. Lawrence's November 1918 "Sharifian plan".

Following the occupation of the Adana Vilayet (the region of Cilicia) in December 1918, a new territory, OETA North, was set up.

The administration ended in OETA West and OETA South in 1920 following the assignment of the Mandate for Syria and the Lebanon and British Mandate for Palestine at the 19–26 April 1920 San Remo conference.

In OETA East, British administration ended following the withdrawal of British forces from the territory in November 1919, and the subsequent declaration of the Arab Kingdom of Syria over the same area. The area was split into two after the French defeated King Faisal in July 1920; the northern part of the territory was combined with the French-administered OETA West, and the southern part became a no man's land and later became the Emirate of Transjordan.

Due to the success of the Turkish War of Independence, Marash, Aintab and Urfa sanjaks of former Aleppo Vilayet remained in Turkey after 1921. Also, Antakya and İskenderun kazas of Aleppo Sanjak in one were separated as the Republic of Hatay in 1938; the republic then instead became a part of Turkey in 1939.

History

Initiation

On 23 October 1918, following the British and Arab forces' defeat of the Ottoman empire, Field Marshal Edmund Allenby announced that Ottoman Syria was to be split into three administrative sub-units, which varied very little from the previous Ottoman divisions:
 OETA South, consisting of the Ottoman Mutasarrifate of Jerusalem and the sanjaks of Nablus and Acre. This was the first administrative definition of what was to become Mandatory Palestine;
 OETA West (originally OETA North, renamed two months later) consisting of the Ottoman Beirut Vilayet, the Mount Lebanon Mutasarrifate, the Sanjak of Latakia, and a number of sub-districts; and 
 OETA East consisting of the Ottoman Damascus Vilayet and the southern part of the Aleppo Vilayet. The governors of Aleppo were later to sponsor the Occupation of Zor. The area of Ma'an and Aqaba was administered by OETA East and claimed by the Hejaz.

In December 1918, following the occupation of the region of Cilicia, a new territory was set up.
 OETA North, consisting of the Adana Vilayet

Later events

Under this administration the immediate needs of the people were provided for, seed grain and live-stock were imported and distributed, finance on easy terms was made available through the Army bankers, a stable currency was set up and postal services restored. Allenby insisted that as long as military administration was required, it was to remain his responsibility.

Military administrators

OETA South chief administrators

The area was divided into four districts: Jerusalem, Jaffa, Majdal and Beersheba, each under a military governor.

Both of the first two British administrators, Generals Money and Watson, were removed by London for not favouring the Zionists over the Arabs; when the OETA administration ended, Zionist politician Herbert Samuel was installed as the first civilian administrator. Samuel recorded his acceptance of the role, and the end of military administration, in an often-quoted document: "Received from Major-General Sir Louis J. Bols K.C.B.—One Palestine, complete."

OETA East administrators
OETA East was a joint Arab-British military administration. The Arab and British armies entered Damascus on 1 October 1918, and on 3 October 1918 Ali Rida al-Rikabi was appointed Military Governor of OETA East. Prince Faisal son of King Hussain of Mecca entered Damascus as on 4 October and appointed Rikabi Chief of the Council of Directors (i.e. prime minister) of Syria.

The boundary definition of OETA East left uncertainties to the south and east, leading to competing claims from the Kingdom of Hejaz and Occupied Iraq respectively – see Occupation of Ma'an and Occupation of Zor for further details.

 Rida al-Rikabi (3 October 1918 – 26 November 1919)

OETA North (West) administrators
 Marie Antoine Philpin de Piépape (7 Oct 1918 - 19 Nov 1918)
 Jules Camille Hamelin (19 Nov 1918 - 21 Nov 1919)
 François Georges Barb (21 Nov 1919 -  1 Sep 1920)

OETA North (Cilicia) administrators
 Édouard Brémond

Initiation and administration
The OETA was established on 23 October 1918, under the accepted rules of military occupation, and defined as follows:

Disestablishment 

The OETA administrations were disestablished at different times in each of the regions, following the formal appointment of civil administrations (prior to the formal coming into force of the mandates):
 OETA South: 1 July 1920, Herbert Samuel was appointed as High Commissioner for Palestine
 OETA West: 31 August 1920, Henri Gouraud proclaimed the State of Greater Lebanon, the Alawite State and the Sanjak of Alexandretta was merged into the State of Aleppo
 OETA East: 26 November 1919, when the British withdrew in favor of the Emirate of Syria.

References

Bibliography
 
 
 Biger, Gideon (2005), The Boundaries of Modern Palestine, 1840-1947. London: Routledge. .

British Empire
World War I
Political entities in the Land of Israel
History of Palestine (region)
20th century in Syria
20th century in Lebanon
1910s in Iraq
20th century in Jordan
States and territories established in 1917
States and territories disestablished in 1920
1917 establishments in Asia
1920 disestablishments in Asia
Former countries of the interwar period